David Bradbury is an Australian film maker who began his career in 1972 as an ABC radio journalist, and has since produced 21 documentary films, including many that tackle difficult political issues and highlight the plight of the disadvantaged. Bradbury has won many international film festival prizes, received five Australian Film Industry awards, and two Academy Award nominations. He graduated from the Australian National University with a degree in political science.

Front Line
Bradbury's first film was Front Line, a portrait of Australian news cameraman Neil Davis in Vietnam. The film received an Academy Award nomination and also won first prize at the Sydney and Melbourne Film Festivals, the Grierson award at the American Film Festival and was screened worldwide.

Public Enemy Number One
Another of Bradbury's films, Public Enemy Number One, followed the life of controversial Australian journalist Wilfred Burchett, the first western journalist into Hiroshima after the bomb was dropped. The film won the Golden Gate Award for Best Documentary, the Christopher Statuette, Best Documentary at the Sydney Film Festival, and an AFI award, but was never shown on Australian TV.

Blowin' In The Wind
Blowin' In The Wind is about the joint military training facility at Shoalwater Bay near Rockhampton. This film follows on from Shoalwater: Up for Grabs which David worked on with then Midnight Oil lead singer Peter Garrett. Blowin' In The Wind looks at some of the health issues surrounding the Shoalwater Bay training facility and the effects of depleted uranium in theatres of war.

A Hard Rain

A Hard Rain is Bradbury’s 2007 documentary feature film that looks at the global nuclear industry from the mining of uranium through to nuclear power, to the radioactive waste and nuclear weapons. It examines the issue of whether Australia should go nuclear.

Other films
Bradbury's other films include:
1984: Nicaragua No Pasaran
1985: Chile Hasta Cuando
1987: South of the Border
1988: State of Shock
1993: Nazi Supergrass
1997: Loggerheads
1997: Jabiluka
2007: Survival School
2009: My Asian Heart
2012: On Borrowed Time

Awards
Best Documentary Film at the 2006 Byron Bay International Film Festival for the movie Blowin' In The Wind.
Stanley Hawes Award winner at the 2008 Australian International Documentary Conference.
Honorary Mention at the 2011 Byron Bay International Film Festival
Best Byron Film at the 2012 Byron Bay International Film Festival for the movie On Borrowed Time.

References

External links

Frontline films
A chronicler of reality on the frontline - Asian Age

Living people
Year of birth missing (living people)
Australian documentary filmmakers
Australian journalists
Australian National University alumni